Costantino Barbella (January 31, 1853 in Chieti – December 5, 1925) was an Italian sculptor, known as il Michetti della scultura.

He began his career by modeling terracotta figurines for churches and Nativity Scenes (Presepe). In 1872, Francesco Paolo Michetti encouraged him to use stipend from the province to study at the Istituto di Belle Arti in Naples. He studied there with Stanislao Lista. He was highly prolific in creating small terracotta and bronze statuary, much of it depicting country folk dancing or in animated movement. He also made a few portraits, including of Pope Leo XIII. His work was exhibited throughout Europe, commonly winning awards. He was named cavaliere dell' Order of Leopold II of Belgium, honorary professor of the Istituto Reale di Belle Arti in Naples, and honorary academician at the Istituto di Belle Arti di Bologna.

Among his students was Argentinian sculptor Lola Mora.

The  "Costantino Barbella" Museum of Art, is located in the Palazzo Martinetti Bianchi in Chieti.

Works

References

1853 births
1925 deaths
People from Chieti
20th-century Italian sculptors
20th-century Italian male artists
19th-century Italian sculptors
Italian male sculptors
Academic staff of the Accademia di Belle Arti di Napoli
19th-century Italian male artists